Finlay Knox (born January 8, 2001) is a Canadian competitive swimmer.

Career
Knox was born in England, and his family moved to New Zealand when he was two years old. Knox's family emigrated to Canada when he was seven.

Knox was named to his first Canadian national team at the 2018 Summer Youth Olympics held in Buenos Aires, Argentina. At this event, Knox won bronze in the 200 m individual medley  In 2019, Knox won two medals at the 2019 FINA World Junior Swimming Championships in Budapest.

As part of the 2021 Canadian Olympic swimming trials in Toronto, Knox broke the national record in the 200 individual medley event, with a time of 1:58.07. This qualified him for the 2020 Summer Olympics in Tokyo. Knox placed seventeenth in the heats of the men's 200 m individual medley, 0.14 seconds behind Japan's Daiya Seto, and thus missed qualifying to the semi-finals.

Knox was part of Canada's team for the 2022 Commonwealth Games, where he won a bronze with the men's team in the 4×100 m freestyle. He was the only member of the team to swim in both the heats and the final. This was the first men's relay medal for Canada at a major event since the 2015 Pan American Games, and the first at the Commonwealth Games since 2006. Knox also reached the finals of the 100 m butterfly and the 200 m medley, placing fourth in the latter.

References

External links
 
 
 
 

2001 births
Living people
Canadian male medley swimmers
Swimmers at the 2018 Summer Youth Olympics
People from Okotoks
Swimmers at the 2020 Summer Olympics
Olympic swimmers of Canada
Youth Olympic bronze medalists for Canada
Swimmers at the 2022 Commonwealth Games
Commonwealth Games medallists in swimming
Commonwealth Games bronze medallists for Canada
Medalists at the FINA World Swimming Championships (25 m)
Medallists at the 2022 Commonwealth Games